Rogers Place is a multipurpose indoor arena in Edmonton. This is a list of past and upcoming events held at the arena.

List of Events

References

Lists of events by venue